The Lviv Oblast football team is a football team representing Lviv Oblast Football Federation and Lviv Oblast. They are not affiliated with FIFA or UEFA, and therefore cannot compete for the FIFA World Cup or the UEFA European Championships.

Lviv competes at the FFU Regions' Cup and at international level they competed at the UEFA Regions' Cup in 2018 finishing 2nd in its group.

International record

Current squad
The following 21 players were called up to the squad for the 2019 UEFA Regions' Cup.
Head Coach:  Vitaliy Ponomaryov (FC Mykolaiv)

Honours 
UEFA Regions' Cup
 Group stage (1): 2019

References 

European national and official selection-teams not affiliated to FIFA
Football clubs in Lviv Oblast
Football teams in Ukraine
Football in the regions of Ukraine
Amateur sport in Ukraine